Tricholauxania praeusta is a species of fly in the family Lauxaniidae. It is found in the  Palearctic .
The larvae are saprophagous.

References

External links
 Ecology of Commanster 

Lauxaniidae
Diptera of Europe
Insects described in 1820